Sasiny may refer to the following places:
Sasiny, Gmina Boćki in Podlaskie Voivodeship (north-east Poland)
Sasiny, Gmina Wyszki in Podlaskie Voivodeship (north-east Poland)
Sasiny, Zambrów County in Podlaskie Voivodeship (north-east Poland)
Sasiny, Warmian-Masurian Voivodeship (north Poland)